Events in the year 1913 in Bulgaria.

Incumbents

Events 

 24 November – Parliamentary elections were held in the country, resulting in a victory for the Liberal Concentration. Liberal Concentration, an alliance of the Liberal Party (Radoslavists), the People's Liberal Party and the Young Liberals Party, between them won 88 of the 204 seats in the parliament. Voter turnout was 55.0%.

References 

 
1910s in Bulgaria
Years of the 20th century in Bulgaria
Bulgaria
Bulgaria